The Starving Games is a 2013 American parody film written and directed by Jason Friedberg and Aaron Seltzer and produced by Peter Safran. The film parodies The Hunger Games and it stars Maiara Walsh, Cody Christian, Brant Daugherty, Lauren Bowles and Diedrich Bader. It is the first film in Friedberg and Seltzer's long-running partnership to be distributed independently. It was released simultaneously in theaters and video on demand by distribution start-up Ketchup Entertainment. The film was released on November 8, 2013 to negative reviews.

Plot 
Kantmiss Evershot practices archery in the forest, but her boyfriend, Dale, surprises her; the arrow accidentally hits the Wizard of Oz. They return to District 12, where children afraid of getting picked for the Games deliberately injure and mutilate themselves to avoid selection. Harry Potter, Ron, and Hermione are seen being forcibly removed from District 12. Kantmiss gives her younger sister, Petunia a golden pin with a "courageous bird" on it. The pin turns out to be a chicken which Petunia then injures herself with and crashes into a house. At the Gathering for the 75th Annual Starving Games, President Snowballs explains his reason for separating America into districts as well as ridiculous prizes for winning, including a half eaten pickle. During the drawing for District 12's contestants, the hostess draws several gag names ("Hugh Janus", "Phil Mahooters", and "Dean Gulberry") to no avail. Petunia has her name drawn, but tricks Kantmiss into volunteering so she can eat her pet hamster when she gets picked, by crying fake tears. Dale tries volunteering as well, but the town idiot, Peter Malarkey beats him to it. Kantmiss and Peter are taken to the Capitol where they attend a televised interview in front of a live audience. Kantmiss wears a dress that catches on fire and burns her when she spins in it during her interview. Peter reveals he has a crush on Marco, a fellow contestant in his interview.
 
When the Games begin, Kantmiss grabs a backpack, but must fight a fellow contestant for it. After being fatally struck by two knives and sawed in half with a weed whacker, the remaining half of this contestant eventually relinquishes the backpack before dying. Kantmiss tries fleeing, but Seleca, the Games' producer, sends Angry Birds to attack her; she defeats them and squashes the Annoying Orange in a Fruit Ninja parody. Peter teams up with a group of contestants led by Marco, who aim to kill Kantmiss. After discovering them, Kantmiss fails to climb up a tree, only to find a ladder up it. Marco tries to kill her with a spear but it kills one of his allies instead. While sitting in the tree, Kantmiss gets her face covered in bird poo after whistling to the birds. Marco and his allies flee when she attempts to make a beehive fall on them, cutting it loose using a chainsaw. Instead, the beehive falls on her own head and she gets severely stung. The venom causes her to hallucinate a quadruple rainbow and being a Na'vi. She is slapped back to her senses by fellow contestant Rudy; they team up, vowing to kill the other contestants first. After Kantmiss and Rudy discuss their plan, Marco reveals he was eavesdropping the whole time and they flee from him. Kantmiss finds herself cornered by Marco and his allies and quickly dispatches everyone except him. He pulls a knife on her, at which point a referee intervenes and begins the halftime show. After the halftime show is played, Marco again tries to kill Kantmiss, but Rudy kicks his shin. Marco then kills Rudy by drop kicking her into a tree.
 
Wanting to spice up the Games, Snowballs decides to implement a lesbian love story, but learns Kantmiss is the only woman left; thus, only a straight romance is possible. After it is announced only a couple can win the games, Kantmiss tries to team up with Marco over Peter, but Seleca fakes being killed to convince her to find Peter instead. Kantmiss kills all of the contestants but Marco and Peter, and flees with the latter to a cave. As Peter starts to have a fever, he reveals that he had been stalking Kantmiss for most of her life. Since Kantmiss is keeping her distance from Peter, Seleca offers to send medical supplies to treat Peter if she gets more intimate with him. While becoming intimate, Gandalf and two dwarves appear in a Lord of the Rings parody, claiming to be drawn to the cave by the sound of incessant moaning. Kantmiss demands they leave and they oblige. Kantmiss has sex with Peter, which is televised. Dale is disgusted by this and storms the Starving Games arena, expressing his hatred for Peter.
 
The next day, Kantmiss and Peter attack Marco, but Snowballs orders Seleca to send in the Expendables. An armed Dale arrives, kills them, and asks Kantmiss to come back with him. When Kantmiss orders him to leave, he breaks up with her by changing his Facebook status to single. Marco holds Peter hostage, but Kantmiss shoots a loaf of bread into his eye, killing him. Seleca then announces there can only be one winner again. Peter tries convincing Kantmiss to commit suicide with him by ingesting poisonous berries, to deny those in charge the satisfaction of them fighting to the death. Instead, Kantmiss kills Peter with an arrow, telling him “shit ain’t personal”. Afterwards, Nick Fury and the Avengers show up, with Fury saying he wants Kantmiss to join the Avengers team as a replacement for Hawkeye. Then the Avengers all die after stepping off their platforms and onto mines.

Parodies

Films 

 The Hunger Games (2012) (main parody)
 Avatar (2009)
 The Avengers (2012)
 Oz the Great and Powerful (2013)
 Harry Potter franchise (2001–2011)
 The Fast and the Furious (2001)
 The Hobbit franchise (2012–2014)
 The Expendables (2010)
 Sherlock Holmes (2009)
 Monty Python
 Office Space (1999)

Real life people 
 LMFAO
 Taylor Swift
 Psy
 Tim Tebow
 Annoying Orange

Games 
 Angry Birds
 Fruit Ninja

Cast 

 Maiara Walsh as Kantmiss Evershot
 Cody Christian as Peter Malarkey 
 Brant Daugherty as Dale
 Diedrich Bader as President Snowballs
 Lauren Bowles as Effoff
 Chris Marroy as Stanley Ceaserman
 Theodus Crane as Cleaver Williams
 Nick Gomez as Na'vi Guy
 Kennedy Hermansen as Petunia Evershot
 Rob Steinberg as Gandalf
 Aaron Jay Rome as Oz
 Matthew Graham Wagner as Harry Potter
 Kyle de Kay as Ron Weasley
 Sarah Reid Vinyard as Hermione
 Jade Roberts as Sylvester Stallone Look-a-like
 Joseph Aviel as Arnold Schwarzenegger Look-a-like
 Eric Buarque as Bruce Willis Look-a-like
 Gene Williams as Chuck Norris Look-a-like
 Jason Stanly as Jason Statham Look-a-like
 Gralen Bryant Banks as Nick Fury
 Jordan Salloum as Hawkeye
 Trenton Rostedt as Thor
 Ian Casselberry as Skyblu Look-a-like
 Shawn Carter Peterson as RedFoo Look-a-like
 Gabby Gremillion as Taylor Swift Look-a-like
 Bryan McClure as The Annoying Orange

Box office performance 
The film grossed $3,889,688 in the international markets.

Reception 
The Starving Games received overwhelmingly negative reviews. Review aggregation website Rotten Tomatoes gives the film an approval rating of 0% based on 9 reviews, with an average score of 1.60/10.

Joe Leydon of Variety called it a "stillborn spoof" and "desperately unfunny".

Scott Foy of Dread Central rated it 1.5 out of 5 stars: 

Gabe Torio of Indiewire wrote that the film "is as terrible as you think it is".

Max Nicholson of IGN called it "a horrible, horrible piece of cinema that needn't be watched by any person ever".

Fred Topel of Crave Online rated it 1.5 out of 10 and called it "more of the same, only worse".

See also
 The Hungover Games
 The Hunger Pains

References

External links
 

American parody films
2013 films
Films directed by Jason Friedberg and Aaron Seltzer
2010s adventure comedy films
American adventure comedy films
Films produced by Peter Safran
Films about death games
2010s parody films
2013 comedy films
2010s English-language films
2010s American films